Josh Voorhees is an American political journalist and senior writer for Slate, and the former editor of its news blog Slatest. He graduated from Davidson College, and currently lives in Iowa City, Iowa. In 2013, he was named a fellow of the Kiplinger Program by Ohio State University. In 2009, the Hill named him one of the 50 most beautiful people of 2009.

Career
Voorhees worked as a teacher in London, England before becoming a journalist. One of his first beats was at Environment and Energy Daily, where he covered the auto industry.

References

American political journalists
Slate (magazine) people
Living people
Davidson College alumni
People from Iowa City, Iowa
Year of birth missing (living people)